Love's Law is a 1917 American silent drama film directed by Tefft Johnson and starring Joan Sawyer, Stuart Holmes and Olga Grey.

Cast
 Joan Sawyer as Innocence, later Moner Moyer 
 Stuart Holmes as Andre 
 Olga Grey as Jealousy 
 Leo Delaney as Undetermined Role 
 Richard Neill as Undetermined Role

References

Bibliography
 Solomon, Aubrey. The Fox Film Corporation, 1915-1935: A History and Filmography. McFarland, 2011.

External links
 

1917 films
1917 drama films
1910s English-language films
American silent feature films
Silent American drama films
American black-and-white films
Films directed by Tefft Johnson
Fox Film films
1910s American films